Julington Creek Plantation is an unincorporated community in the larger community of St. Johns, St. Johns County, Florida, United States. It consists of several large neighborhoods, and is located along Race Track Road east of State Road 13, across from Fruit Cove (which is also the name of a census-designated place that includes Julington Creek Plantation).

St. Johns County is the second-wealthiest county in Florida. Zip code 32259 (Julington Creek, St. John's, Fruitcove) is considered the young Ponte Vedra because of its age demographics ranging from 30 to 50 and being second only to neighboring Ponte Vedra in having the highest per capita wealth in northeast Florida but having the highest per capita disposal income. With major super markets, pharmacies, top-ranked restaurants, golf courses, and numerous office parks, the Julington Creek area's population continued to grow significantly in the 2010s.

Julington Creek Plantation is served by the highest ranked schools in Florida which, according to the Huffington Post, are among the "Top Ten in the Country". http://www.huffingtonpost.com/2013/05/17/top-school-districts-with-affordable-housing_n_3293302.html

St. Johns County schools have received a state government grade of "A" for their work with the students and FCAT grading from 2004 to 2014.

The neighborhood of Julington Creek Plantation has a new $15 million country club-style clubhouse with a state-of-the-art gym, skate board park, turf football and lacrosse field, four soccer fields, volleyball and four basketball courts, and a full-service restaurant. Other amenities include 130 lakes, 1200 acres of nature trails, parks, playgrounds, and a top-rated golf course.
Centrally located on the east side of the St. Johns River with the intracoastal waterway to the west, it houses its own boat marina and water view restaurants. Mickelers Landing Beach is east of the neighborhood.

References

External links
 Julington Creek Plantation - Official Property Owners Association Website
 Julington Creek Plantation - Official Community Development District Website

Unincorporated communities in St. Johns County, Florida
Unincorporated communities in the Jacksonville metropolitan area
Unincorporated communities in Florida
Planned communities in Florida